Steven Elliot Koonin (born December 12, 1951) is an American theoretical physicist and former director of the Center for Urban Science and Progress at New York University. He is also a professor in the Department of Civil and Urban Engineering at NYU's Tandon School of Engineering. From 2004 to 2009, Koonin was employed by BP as the oil and gas company’s Chief Scientist. From 2009 to 2011, he was Under Secretary for Science, Department of Energy, in the Obama administration.

Biography
Born in Brooklyn, New York City, Koonin graduated from high school at the age of 16, received his Bachelor of Science from the California Institute of Technology and his Ph.D. from the Massachusetts Institute of Technology under the supervision of Arthur Kerman in the MIT Center for Theoretical Physics. In 1975, Koonin joined the faculty of the California Institute of Technology as an assistant professor of theoretical physics becoming one of their youngest ever faculty, and served as the institute's provost from 1995 to 2004.

In 2004, Koonin joined BP as their chief scientist, where he was responsible for guiding the company's long-range technology strategy, particularly in alternative and renewable energy sources. He was tapped for the position of Under Secretary for Science at the United States Department of Energy by Steven Chu, Obama's Secretary of Energy, and served from May 19, 2009, to November 18, 2011. Koonin left in November 2011 for a position at the Institute for Defense Analyses. In 2012, he was appointed the founding director of NYU's Center for Urban Science and Progress (CUSP).

He has served on numerous advisory bodies for the National Science Foundation, the Department of Defense, and the Department of Energy and its various national laboratories, such as the JASON defense advisory group, which he has chaired. Koonin's research interests have included theoretical nuclear, many-body, and computational physics, nuclear astrophysics, and global environmental science.

Views on climate change 
Koonin became publicly involved in the policy debate about climate change starting with a Wall Street Journal opinion piece in 2017, in which he floated the idea of a red team/blue team exercise for climate science. In 2018, the Environmental Protection Agency (EPA) under the leadership of Scott Pruitt proposed a public debate on climate change to refute the 2017 Climate Science Special Report. According to a draft press release edited by Koonin and William Happer, Princeton physics professor and director of the CO2 Coalition, they planned "red team"/blue team exercises to challenge the scientific consensus on climate. The draft was never released, and the plans were not carried out.

In 2019, the Trump Administration proposed to create a "Presidential Committee on Climate Security" at the National Security Council that would conduct an "adversarial" review of the scientific consensus on climate change. Koonin was actively involved in recruiting others to be part of this review. The committee was scrapped in favor of an initiative not "subject to the same level of public disclosure as a formal advisory committee".

In 2021, Koonin published the book Unsettled: What Climate Science Tells Us, What It Doesn't, and Why It Matters.

Criticism of Koonin's 2014 Wall Street Journal commentary
In an article in Slate, physicist Raymond Pierrehumbert criticized Koonin's 2014 commentary in The Wall Street Journal, "Climate Science Is Not Settled," as "a litany of discredited arguments" with "nuggets of truth ... buried beneath a rubble of false or misleading claims from the standard climate skeptics' canon."

Reception of 2021 book Unsettled
Critics of Koonin's book Unsettled accused him of cherry picking data, muddying the waters surrounding the science of climate change, and having no experience in climate science.

In a review in Scientific American, economist Gary Yohe wrote that Koonin "falsely suggest[s] that we don't understand the risks well enough to take action":

Physicist Mark Boslough, a former student of Koonin, posted a critical review at Yale Climate Connections. He stated that "Koonin makes use of an old strawman concocted by opponents of climate science in the 1990s to create an illusion of arrogant scientists, biased media, and lying politicians – making them easier to attack."

Nonprofit organization Inside Climate News reported that climate scientists call Koonin's conclusions "fatally out of date ... and based on the 2013 physical science report of the Intergovernmental Panel on Climate Change (IPCC)."

Mark P. Mills, a senior fellow at the Manhattan Institute, a conservative think tank, and faculty fellow at Northwestern University’s McCormick School of Engineering and Applied Science, lauded the book in The Wall Street Journal as "rebut[ing] much of the dominant political narrative". Twelve scientists analyzed Mills's arguments and said that he merely repeated Koonin's incorrect and misleading claims. Koonin responded with an article answering these critics.

Publications

References

1951 births
Living people
Obama administration personnel
Stuyvesant High School alumni
People associated with energy
BP people
Members of the United States National Academy of Sciences
California Institute of Technology alumni
Massachusetts Institute of Technology alumni
California Institute of Technology faculty
Members of JASON (advisory group)
New York University faculty
Polytechnic Institute of New York University faculty
MIT Center for Theoretical Physics alumni
Fellows of the American Physical Society